Russian Journal of Nematology (Russian: Rossiĭskiĭ Nematologicheskiĭ Zhurnal) is a peer-reviewed scientific journal covering all aspects of studying nematodes. It was established in 1993 and is published by Russian Society of Nematologists. The editors-in-chief are Roland Perry (Rothamsted Research) Sergei Subbotin (California Department of Food and Agriculture) and Sergei Spiridonov (Russian Academy of Sciences).

Abstracting and indexing 
The journal is abstracted and indexed in:

References

External links 
 

English-language journals

Nematology journals
Publications established in 1993
Biannual journals
Zoology journals

ru: Российский Нематологический Журнал